In the Hebrew Bible/Old Testament Book of Job (c. 6th century BCE?), Zophar ( Ṣōp̄ar, "chirping; rising early"; also Tzofar) the Naamathite is one of the three friends of Job who visit to comfort him during his illness. He suggests that Job's suffering could be divine punishment, and goes into great detail about the consequences of living a life of sin.

"Naamathite" (na'-a-ma-thit) is a Gentile name, suggesting he was from a city called Naamah, perhaps in Arabia.

Speeches
Unlike friends Bildad and Eliphaz, Zophar only speaks twice to Job. He is the most impetuous and dogmatic of the three. Zophar is the first to accuse Job directly of wickedness; averring indeed that his punishment is too good for him (Job 11:6), he rebukes Job's impious presumption in trying to find out the unsearchable secrets of God; and yet, like Job's other friends, he promises peace and restoration on condition of penitence and putting away iniquity. Zophar's second speech is a lecture on the fate of the wicked, ending with a summary appraisal in the style of his friend Bildad,

See also 
Bildad
Eliphaz
Elihu

References

Attribution

Book of Job people
People whose existence is disputed